The 2016 Real Monarchs SLC season is the club's second season of existence, and second playing in the United Soccer League, the third tier of the American soccer pyramid. The season began on March 26 at home against Saint Louis FC, and will end on September 24.

Players
As of March 24, 2016

Competitions

Preseason

USL Season

Matches

March

April

May

June

July

August

September

Results Summary

Standings

Stats
Stats from USL regular season. Players in italics loaned from parent club Real Salt Lake.

References

2016 USL season
2016
2016 in sports in Utah
American soccer clubs 2016 season